Falkefjell was an 8,072-ton motor vessel built by Kockums, Sweden in 1931 for AB Falkefjell.

Operational history
Falkefjell was chartered to the Anglo-Saxon Company and was requisitioned by the Royal Navy and loaned to the Royal Australian Navy as a fleet replenishment oiler in December 1941. She was returned to the British Admiralty in April 1942.

Fate
Renamed Uarda in 1957, she arrived at Hong Kong on 5 December to be broken up.

Notes

1931 ships
Ships built in Malmö
Tankers of the Royal Australian Navy